Teresa Martin-Pelegrina (born 11 November 1997) is a field and indoor hockey player from Germany, who plays as a forward.

Career

Club hockey
In the German Bundesliga, Martin-Pelegrina plays for UHC Hamburg.

International hockey

Under–21
Teresa Martin-Pelegrina made her debut for the German Under–21 side in 2016, during a test series against England in Bisham Abbey. She went on to represent the side at the FIH Junior World Cup in Santiago later that year, where the team finished fifth.

She went on to represent the junior team until 2018.

Indoor
In 2016, Martin-Pelegrina debuted for the German Indoor side at the EuroHockey Indoor Championship in Minsk. Since her debut she has represented the team at a further two EuroHockey Indoor Championships, winning gold in 2018.

Die Danas
Following appearances for the Junior and Indoor teams, Martin-Pelegrina debuted for the Die Danas in 2017, during a test series against Ireland in Düsseldorf.

During her career, she has represented the national team at major tournaments including the FIH World League, EuroHockey Nations Championships and the FIH Pro League.

International goals

References

External links

1997 births
Living people
German female field hockey players
Female field hockey forwards
German women's ice hockey players